PVSK-Panthers, for sponsorship reasons known as PVSK-Veolia or simply Pécs, is a men's basketball club based in Pécs, Hungary. It was the oldest non-Budapest based basketball club playing in the Nemzeti Bajnokság I/A, the first division of Hungary, until 2022, when they were relegated. They played 53 seasons in the top division, which is the second most after MAFC. PVSK-Panthers won one trophy in its history: the Hungarian Cup in 2009.

History
The team was founded in 1944, they played in the 1st division from 1946 to 1950, then after 4 year, from 1955 to 1985 continuously (with once in 1972 in the 2nd league). In 1985 they fall to the 2nd, in 1992 to the 3rd league. In 1994 they moved to Pécsvárad. In 2000 they won the 3rd division and moved back to Pécs, in 2003 they returned into the top flight. In 2009 they won the regular season and the Hungarian Cup, and finished runner-up in the play-offs.

In Pécs, there was another basketball team. In the 1940s and 1950s the PEAC was placed in the 1st division too, and then in the 1990s again under the name of Matáv SE Pécs. Currently they are in the 2nd league.

Honours

Domestic competitions
Nemzeti Bajnokság I/A (National Championship of Hungary)
 Runners-up (1): 2008–09
 Third place (1): 2006–07

Magyar Kupa (National Cup of Hungary)
 Winners (1): 2009
 Bronze medal (1): 1983, 2007

Current roster

Season by season

Notable players
 Zoltán Horváth (2003–05)
 Stojan Ivković (2004–06)
 Dragan Aleksić  (2005–09)
 Krisztián Wittmann (2006–09)
 András Ruják (2009–10, 2019–21)
 Alex Legion (2012–13)
 Brad Loesing (2012–13)
 Marino Šarlija (2013–14)
 Zoltán Supola (2016–18)

External links

Basketball teams in Hungary
Basketball teams established in 1944